Laurence King Publishing is an publishing house based in London, with offices in Europe and the USA. It was founded by Laurence King in 1991. 

Laurence King Publishing publish over 120 new titles every year for the mainstream adult, children's and gifting markets, on topics including architecture, art, design, fashion, film, photography and popular culture. 

In 2017 Laurence King Publishing founded a Berlin-based subsidiary, Laurence King Verlag, and acquired BIS Publishers, based in Amsterdam. 

Laurence King Publishing is a participant in The Book Chain Project.

Hachette UK announced the purchase of Laurence King Publishing  on 31 August 2020 for an undisclosed amount. LKP’s gift, trade and art publishing will become an imprint of Orion Publishing Group. LKP’s student and professional publishing will become an imprint of Quercus and LKP’s children’s publishing will become part of Hachette Children’s Group.

Publications

Laurence King Publishing has published a number of popular titles, including a monograph on the American designer Saul Bass; a book by illustrator Marion Deuchars, Let’s Make Some Great Art; the art history text A World History of Art by Hugh Honour and John Fleming; and a series of adult coloring books by Scottish illustrator Johanna Basford.

References

External links 
 Laurence King Publishing Website 

British companies established in 1991
Publishing companies established in 1991
Companies based in the London Borough of Islington
Publishing companies of the United Kingdom